The Big Lava Bed, located in the Gifford Pinchot National Forest in the southwestern area of the State of Washington, originated from a 500-foot-deep crater in the northern center of the bed. The Big Lava Bed is the youngest feature of the Indian Heaven volcanic field. The 0.9-cubic kilometer lava flow erupted from the cinder cone about 8200 years ago. The lava flow traveled 13 km from the source crater. Lodgepole pine, alder, and other pioneer plants struggle to grow, seen sparsely growing between and amid towering rock piles, caves, and strange lava formations. Access into the interior of the lava bed is difficult, since there are no roads or trails crossing the lava field. Explorers who wish to venture deep within the lava flow are advised to choose their route carefully. Compasses are not always reliable, since local magnetic influences affect their magnetic performance in the vast expanse of rock.

See also
 Cascade Volcanoes
 List of volcanoes in the United States
 Indian Heaven Wilderness

References

External links
 Gifford Pinchot National Forest - About the Forest (Subsection: Big Lava Bed)
 Gifford Pinchot National Forest - Indian Heaven Wilderness
 USGS - Indian Heaven Volcanic Field

Cascade Range
Volcanic fields of Washington (state)
Subduction volcanoes
Cascade Volcanoes
Landforms of Skamania County, Washington
Polygenetic volcanic fields
Pleistocene volcanism
Holocene volcanism
Gifford Pinchot National Forest
Lava fields
Cinder cones of the United States